George Horner is the name of:

George Horner (died 1677) (1605–1677), English MP for Somerset
George Horner (died 1707) (1646–1707), English MP for Somerset - son of above
Red Horner (George Reginald Horner, 1909–2005), Canadian ice hockey player
George William Horner (1849–1930), translator of Coptic versions of the Bible
George Horner (musician) (1923–2015), pianist at Terezin concentration camp

See also
William George Horner (1786–1837), British mathematician